Pyrrolobenzodiazepines (PBD) are a class of compound that may have antibiotic or anti-tumor properties.

Some dimeric pyrrolobenzodiazepines are used as the cytotoxic drug payloads in antibody-drug conjugates, for example in vadastuximab talirine.

References

Antibiotics